Hacksaw Ridge is a 2016 biographical war film directed by Mel Gibson and written by Andrew Knight and Robert Schenkkan, based on the 2004 documentary The Conscientious Objector directed by Terry Benedict.

The film focuses on the World War II experiences of Desmond Doss, an American pacifist combat medic who, as a Seventh-day Adventist Christian, refused to carry or use a weapon or firearm of any kind. Doss became the first conscientious objector to be awarded the Medal of Honor, for service above and beyond the call of duty during the Battle of Okinawa. Andrew Garfield stars as Doss, with Sam Worthington, Luke Bracey, Teresa Palmer, Hugo Weaving, Rachel Griffiths, and Vince Vaughn in supporting roles.

Filming took place in Australia from September to December 2015. Hacksaw Ridge was released in the United States on November 4, 2016, grossing $180.4 million worldwide, and received critical acclaim, with Gibson's direction and Garfield's performance earning particular praise. It was widely viewed as a return to form for Gibson, whose career had been in decline following several controversies. Hacksaw Ridge was chosen by the National Board of Review and American Film Institute as one of their top ten films of 2016 respectively,and has received numerous awards and nominations. The film received six Oscar nominations at the 89th Academy Awards, including Best Picture, Best Director, Best Actor for Garfield, and Best Sound Editing, winning the awards for Best Sound Mixing and Best Film Editing. It also received Golden Globe nominations for Best Picture, Best Director, and Best Actor, and 12 AACTA Awards nominations, winning the majority, including Best Film, Best Direction, Best Original Screenplay, Best Actor for Garfield, and Best Supporting Actor for Weaving.

Plot

In 1925 Lynchburg, Virginia, young Desmond Doss nearly kills his brother during roughhousing. That event and his Seventh-day Adventist upbringing reinforce Desmond's belief in the commandment "Thou shalt not kill." Fifteen years later, Doss takes an injured man to the hospital and meets a nurse, Dorothy Schutte. They strike a romance, and Doss tells Dorothy of his interest in medical work.

After the Japanese attack on Pearl Harbor brings the United States into World War II, Doss enlists in the United States Army to serve as a combat medic. His father, Tom, a First World War veteran, is deeply upset by the decision. Desmond and Dorothy get engaged.

Doss is placed in basic training under the command of Sergeant Howell. He excels physically but becomes a pariah among his fellow soldiers for refusing to handle a rifle and train on Saturdays. Howell and Captain Glover attempt to discharge Doss for psychiatric reasons under Section 8 but are overruled, as Doss's religious beliefs do not constitute mental illness. They subsequently torment Doss by putting him through grueling labor, intending to drive Doss out. Despite being beaten one night by his fellow soldiers, he refuses to identify his attackers.

Doss's unit completes basic training and is released on leave during which Doss intends to marry Dorothy, but his refusal to carry a firearm leads to an arrest for insubordination. Captain Glover and Dorothy visit Doss in jail and try to convince him to plead guilty so that he can be released without charge, but Doss refuses to compromise his beliefs. At his court-martial, Doss pleads not guilty, but before he is sentenced, his father barges into the tribunal with a letter from his former commanding officer (now a brigadier general) stating that his son's pacifism is protected by the US Constitution. The charges against Doss are dropped, and he and Dorothy are married.

Doss's unit is assigned to the 77th Infantry Division and deployed to the Pacific Theater. During the Battle of Okinawa, Doss's unit will relieve the 96th Infantry Division, which was tasked with ascending and securing the Maeda Escarpment ("Hacksaw Ridge"). During the initial fight, with heavy losses on both sides, Doss saves the life of his squadmate Smitty, earning his respect. As the Americans camp for the night, Doss reveals to Smitty that his aversion to holding a firearm stems from nearly shooting his drunken father, who threatened his mother with a gun. Smitty apologizes for doubting his courage, and both reconcile.

The next morning, the Japanese launched a massive counterattack and drive the Americans off the escarpment. Smitty is killed, and Howell and several of Doss's comrades are left injured on the battlefield. Doss hears the cries of dying soldiers and returns to save them, carrying the wounded, and Smitty's body, to the cliff's edge and belaying them down by rope, each time praying to save one more. The arrival of dozens of wounded who had been presumed dead comes as a shock to the rest of the unit below. When day breaks, Doss rescues Howell, and both escape Hacksaw under enemy fire.

Captain Glover apologizes for dismissing Doss's beliefs as "cowardice" and states that they are scheduled to retake the ridge on Saturday but will not launch the next attack without him. Doss agrees, but the operation is delayed until after he concludes his Sabbath prayers. With reinforcements, they turn the tide of battle. In an ambush set by Japanese soldiers who pretend to surrender, Doss manages to save Glover and others by deflecting enemy grenades. Doss is wounded by a grenade blast, but the battle is won. Doss is lowered from the cliff clutching the Bible that Dorothy had given to him.

The film switches to real photos and footage showing that Doss was awarded the Medal of Honor by President Harry S. Truman for rescuing 75 soldiers at Hacksaw Ridge, as well as real-life footage of Doss just before his death, recounting his experiences during the war.

Cast

Production

Development
Hacksaw Ridge was in development limbo for 14 years. Numerous producers had tried for decades to film Doss's story, including decorated war hero Audie Murphy and Hal B. Wallis.

In 2001, after finally convincing Doss that making a movie on his remarkable life was the right thing to do, screenwriter/producer Gregory Crosby (grandson of Bing Crosby) wrote the treatment and brought the project to film producer David Permut, of Permut Presentations, through the early cooperation of Stan Jensen of the Seventh-day Adventist Church, which ultimately led to the film being financed.

In 2004, director Terry Benedict won the rights to make a documentary about Doss, The Conscientious Objector, and secured the dramatic film rights in the process. However, Doss died in 2006, after which producer Bill Mechanic acquired and then sold the rights to Walden Media, which developed the project along with producer David Permut. Walden Media insisted on a PG-13 version of the battle, and Mechanic spent years working to buy the rights back.

After acquiring the rights, Mechanic approached Mel Gibson, and wanted him to create a concoction of violence and faith, as he did with The Passion of the Christ (2004). Gibson turned down the offer twice, as he previously did with Braveheart (1995). Nearly a decade later, Gibson finally agreed to direct, a decision announced in November 2014. The same month, Andrew Garfield was confirmed to play the role of Desmond Doss.

With a budget of $40 million, the team still faced many challenges. Hacksaw Ridge became an international co-production, with key players and firms located in both the United States and Australia. When Australian tax incentives were taken off the table, the film had to qualify as Australian to receive government subsidies. Despite being American-born, Gibson's early years in Australia helped the film qualify, along with most of the cast being Australian, including Rachel Griffiths, Teresa Palmer, Sam Worthington, Hugo Weaving, Richard Roxburgh, and Luke Bracey. Rounding out the cast was American actor Vince Vaughn. According to producer Bill Mechanic, Australian state and federal subsidies made financing the film possible. James M. Vernon, an Australian Executive Producer on Hacksaw Ridge helped the film qualify for Australian government subsidies.

On February 9, 2015, IM Global closed a deal to finance the film, and also sold the film into the international markets. On the same day, Lionsgate acquired the North American distribution rights to the film. Chinese distribution rights were acquired by Bliss Media, a Shanghai-based film production and distribution company.

Hacksaw Ridge is the first film directed by Gibson since Apocalypto in 2006, and marks a departure from his previous films, such as Apocalypto and Braveheart, in which the protagonists acted violently.

Writing
Robert Schenkkan made the initial draft and Randall Wallace, who was previously attached to direct the film, rewrote the script. Andrew Knight polished the revised script. Gibson's business partner Bruce Davey also produced the film, along with Paul Currie.

Casting
The cast—Andrew Garfield, Vince Vaughn, Sam Worthington, Luke Bracey, Teresa Palmer, Rachel Griffiths, Richard Roxburgh, Luke Pegler, Richard Pyros, Ben Mingay, Firass Dirani, Nico Cortez, Michael Sheasby, Goran Kleut, Jacob Warner, Harry Greenwood, Damien Thomlinson, Ben O'Toole, Benedict Hardie, Robert Morgan, Ori Pfeffer, Milo Gibson, and Nathaniel Buzolic, Hugo Weaving, and Ryan Corr—was announced between November 2014 and October 2015. The younger Doss was played by Darcy Bryce.

Garfield plays Desmond Doss, a US Army medic awarded the Medal of Honor by President Harry S. Truman for saving lives during the Battle of Okinawa in World War II. Garfield had high regard for Doss, and venerated him for his act of bravery, hailing him as a "wonderful symbol of embodying the idea of live and let live no matter what your ideology is, no matter what your value system is, just to allow other people to be who they are and allow yourself to be who you are." He found the idea of playing a real superhero, as compared to his past roles playing Spider-Man in The Amazing Spider-Man and its sequel, much more inspiring. Garfield admitted that he cried the first time he read the screenplay. He visited Doss' hometown and touched his various tools. Gibson was drawn to Garfield the first time he saw his performance in The Social Network.

Principal photography
Principal photography started on September 29, 2015, and lasted for 59 days, ending in December of that year. Filming took place entirely in Australia. The film was based at Fox Studios in Sydney, after producers vigorously scouted for locations around the country. Filming took place mostly in the state of New South Wales.

The cliff was filmed at a disused "Long Street Quarry" adjacent to the Main Southern railway line north of Goulburn. The grounds of Newington Armory at Sydney Olympic Park were used as Fort Jackson. Filming in Bringelly required the team to clear and deforest over 500 hectares of land, which evoked the ire of some environmentalists. However, the producers had complete approval and clearance to do so. Conditions were imposed to replant and rehabilitate part of the land after filming. According to Minister for the Arts, Troy Grant, the film brought 720 jobs and US$19 million to regional and rural New South Wales. Filming locations included Richmond, Bringelly, and Oran Park and Centennial Park.

Altogether, three jeeps, two trucks, and a tank were featured in the film. Bulldozers and backhoes were used to transform a dairy pasture near Sydney to re-create the Okinawa battlefield. A berm had to be raised around the perimeter so cameras could turn 360 degrees without getting any eucalyptus trees in the background. Gibson did not want to rely heavily on computer visual effects, either on the screen or in pre-visualizing the battle scenes. Visual effects were used only during bloody scenes, like napalm-burnt soldiers. During filming of the battle scenes, Gibson incorporated his past war-movie experiences, and would yell to the actors, reminding them constantly of what they were fighting for.

Post-production
Kevin O'Connell, who won his first Academy Awards for sound mixing in this film after 21 nominations, stated budget constraints forced him to use archival sounds of WWII-era weapons.

Themes
The film has been described as an anti-war film, with pacifist themes. It also incorporates recurring religious imagery, such as baptism and ascension.

Historical accuracy

After the war, Doss turned down many requests for books and film versions of his actions, because he was wary of his life, wartime experiences, and Seventh-day Adventist beliefs being portrayed inaccurately or sensationally. Doss's only child, Desmond Doss Jr., stated: "The reason he declined is that none of them adhered to his one requirement: that it be accurate. And I find it remarkable, the level of accuracy in adhering to the principle of the story in this movie." Producer David Permut stated that the filmmakers took great care in maintaining the integrity of the story, since Doss was very religious.

However, the filmmakers changed some details, notably the backstory of his father being a World War I veteran, the incident with the gun Doss took out of his alcoholic father's hands, and the circumstance of his first marriage. The character of Smitty, portrayed by Luke Bracey, is an amalgamation of various soldiers who tormented Doss and was created for narrative reasons. Another change is Harold Doss, who is shown serving in Army, when in reality, he served in the Navy onboard the USS Lindsey. Other changes occur near the end of the film, when Doss is placed on a stretcher. In real life, Doss had another wounded man take his place on the stretcher. After treating the soldier, a sniper shot fractured Doss's arm, and he crawled  to safety after being left alone for five hours. Gibson omitted that from the film because he felt that the audience would not find the scene believable. The film also omits his prior combat service in the Battle of Guam and Battle of Leyte (Doss was awarded the Bronze Star Medal for extraordinary bravery in both battles), and it leaves the impression that Doss's actions at Okinawa took place over a period of a few days, but his Medal of Honor citation covered his actions over a period of about three weeks (April 29 to May 21). The visual blog Information is Beautiful stated that the film was 52.7% accurate when compared to real-life events, summarizing that "most of the main war-related events did take place, although not all in the timeframe of the film... also, much of the pre-war stuff is either invented or distorted".

Music
James Horner was originally approached to compose the score for the film but was replaced by John Debney after Horner's death in 2015. Debney was himself replaced by Rupert Gregson-Williams after his score was rejected before Hacksaw Ridge was set to premiere at the Venice Film Festival. When composing the music Gregson-Williams commented: "The soundtrack is really in two parts. A lovely romance blossoms as Desmond discovers both the love of his life and his faith. The second half of the movie is brutal. We wanted to reflect his spirituality without being pious, and his bravery without celebrating violence." The film's accompanying score was recorded at Abbey Road Studios in London, with an orchestra of 70 musicians and a 36-voice choir conducted by Cliff Masterson.

Release
The world premiere of Hacksaw Ridge occurred on September 4, 2016, at the 73rd Venice Film Festival, where it received a 10-minute standing ovation. The film was released in Australia on November 3, 2016, by Icon Film Distribution, and in the United States on November 4, 2016, by Lionsgate/Summit Entertainment. It was released by Bliss Media in China in November, and in the United Kingdom in 2017, with IM Global handling international sales.

Marketing
On July 28, 2016, Lionsgate released the only official trailer for Hacksaw Ridge which garnered millions of views. In partnership with Disabled American Veterans, Gibson screened the film at both the DAV National Convention and VFW National Convention in August 2016 to raise awareness of veterans' issues. Within the same month, Gibson also appeared at Pastor Greg Laurie's SoCal Harvest in Anaheim, California to promote the film. A number of Seventh-day Adventist ministries offered free copies of the Hero of Hacksaw Ridge book during the film's release as well as created promotional materials to highlight Doss's faith. On February 24, 2017, Reto-Moto and Lionsgate announced a cross-promotion where the purchase of a DLC pack for Heroes & Generals would also give the purchaser a digital copy of the film.

Reception

Box office
Hacksaw Ridge grossed $67.2 million in the United States and Canada and $113.2 million in other countries for a worldwide total of $180.4 million, against a production budget of $40 million.

The film opened alongside Doctor Strange and Trolls, and was projected to gross around $12 million from 2,886 theaters.  It made $5.2 million on its first day and $15.2 million in its opening weekend, finishing third at the box office behind Doctor Strange and Trolls. The debut was on par with the $15 million opening of Gibson's last directorial effort, Apocalypto, in 2006. In its second weekend, the film grossed $10.6 million (a drop of just 30%), finishing 5th at the box office.

The film also opened successfully in China, grossing over $16 million in its first four days at the box office and over $60 million in total.

Critical response
On review aggregator Rotten Tomatoes, the film has an approval rating of 84% based on 282 reviews, with an average rating of 7.30/10. The site's critical consensus reads, "Hacksaw Ridge uses a real-life pacifist's legacy to lay the groundwork for a gripping wartime tribute to faith, valor, and the courage of remaining true to one's convictions." On Metacritic, the film has a weighted average score of 71 out of 100, based on 47 critics, indicating "generally favorable reviews". Audiences polled by CinemaScore gave an average grade of "A" on an A+ to F scale, while PostTrak reported filmgoers gave it a 91% overall positive score and a 67% "definite recommend".

The Milford Daily News called the film a "masterpiece", adding that it "is going to end up on many 2016 Top 10 lists, that should get Oscar nominations for Best Actor, Best Director, and Best Picture". Maggie Stancu of Movie Pilot wrote that "Gibson made some of his most genius directing choices in Hacksaw Ridge, and Garfield has given his best performance yet. With amazing performances by Vince Vaughn, Teresa Palmer, Sam Worthington and Hugo Weaving, it is absolutely one of 2016's must-see films."

Mick LaSalle of SFGate called the film "a brilliant return for Mel Gibson, which confirms his position as a director with a singular talent for spectacle and a sure way with actors". In The Film Lawyers, Samar Khan called Hacksaw Ridge "fantastic" and emphasised "just how wonderful it is to have Gibson back in a more prominent position in Hollywood, hopefully with the demons of his past behind him. If Hacksaw Ridge is any indication, we are poised for a future filled with great films from the visionary director."

The Daily Telegraph awarded four out of five, and added: "Hacksaw Ridge is a fantastically moving and bruising war film that hits you like a raw topside of beef in the face—a kind of primary-coloured Guernica that flourishes on a big screen with a crowd."

The Guardian also awarded the film four out of five, and stated that Gibson had "absolutely hit Hacksaw Ridge out of the park." The Australians reviewer was equally positive, stating that, as a director, "Gibson's approach is bold and fearless; this represents his best work to date behind the camera". Rex Reed of Observer rated it four out of five, and called it "the best war film since Saving Private Ryan... [I]t is violent, harrowing, heartbreaking and unforgettable. And yes, it was directed by Mel Gibson. He deserves a medal, too". Michael Smith of Tulsa World called Hacksaw Ridge a "moving character study" and praised both the direction and acting: "It's truly remarkable how Gibson can film scenes of such heartfelt emotion with such sweet subtlety as easily as he stages some of the most vicious, visual scenes of violence that you will ever see. ... Hacksaw Ridge is beautiful and brutal, and that's a potent combination for a movie about a man determined to serve his country, as well as his soul."

IGN critic Alex Welch gave a score of eight out of ten, praising it as "one of the most successful war films of recent memory. . at times horrifying, inspiring, and heart-wrenching". Mike Ryan of Uproxx gave the film a positive review, praising Gibson's direction and saying, "There are two moments during the second half of Mel Gibson's Hacksaw Ridge when I literally jumped out of my seat in terror. The film's depiction of war is the best I've seen since Saving Private Ryan."

Peter Travers of Rolling Stone gave the film three and a half out of five, writing, "Thanks to some of the greatest battle scenes ever filmed, Gibson once again shows his staggering gifts as a filmmaker, able to juxtapose savagery with aching tenderness." In contrast, Matt Zoller Seitz for RogerEbert.com gave the film two and a half out of four stars, and described the film as "a movie at war with itself."

Accolades and awards

Hacksaw Ridge won Best Film Editing and Best Sound Mixing and was nominated for Best Picture, Best Director, Best Actor for Garfield, and Best Sound Editing at the Academy Awards. The film won Best Editing and was nominated for Best Actor in a Leading Role for Garfield, Best Adapted Screenplay, Best Sound, and Best Makeup and Hair at the British Academy Film Awards. The film won Best Action Movie and Best Actor in an Action Movie for Garfield and was nominated for Best Picture, Best Director, Best Actor for Garfield, Best Editing, and Best Hair and Makeup at the Critics' Choice Awards. The film received three nominations at the Golden Globe Awards, including Best Motion Picture – Drama, Best Actor – Motion Picture Drama for Garfield, and Best Director. The film won Best Actor for Garfield, Best Film Editing and Best Sound and was nominated for Best Film, Best Director, Best Adapted Screenplay, Best Cinematography, Best Original Score, and Best Art Direction and Production Design at the Satellite Awards.

See also
 The Conscientious Objector (2004 documentary about Doss)
 Joseph G. LaPointe Jr., U.S. Army combat medic who received the Medal of Honor for actions in Vietnam
 Thomas W. Bennett (conscientious objector), U.S. Army combat medic who received the Medal of Honor for actions in Vietnam

References

External links

 
 
 
 
 

2010s American films
2010s English-language films
2016 biographical drama films
2016 drama films
2016 war drama films
American biographical drama films
American war drama films
American World War II films
Anti-war films about World War II
Australian biographical drama films
Australian war drama films
Australian World War II films
BAFTA winners (films)
Battle of Okinawa
Biographical films about military personnel
Cross Creek Pictures films
Drama films based on actual events
Films about Christianity
Films about the United States Army
Films directed by Mel Gibson
Films produced by Brian Oliver
Films produced by Bruce Davey
Films scored by Rupert Gregson-Williams
Films set in 1945
Films set in Japan
Films set in Okinawa Prefecture
Films set in South Carolina
Films set in Virginia
Films set on islands
Films shot in Sydney
Films that won the Best Sound Mixing Academy Award
Films whose editor won the Best Film Editing Academy Award
Icon Productions films
Japan in non-Japanese culture
Lionsgate films
Pacific War films
Summit Entertainment films
World War II films based on actual events